Stardoll is a browser-based game from Glorious Games. One of the world's largest online fashion communities, Stardoll has reached over 400 million users as of January 2016.

Focusing on an audience that is often overlooked by the gaming industry, Stardoll is open to everyone but focuses on providing a place for teens and young women to express their creativity and manage their own virtual fashion world, engage in creative social activities with other players around the world, and participate in mini games and challenges.

History
Stardoll first appeared as a personal website featuring paper dolls from Finnish creator and enthusiast, Liisa Wrang. Inspired by a childhood passion for paper dolls, Wrang started drawing dolls and accompanying wardrobes and taught herself web design. Her personal homepage rapidly became a popular destination for teens. In 2004, with the help of her son, she upgraded the site and called it Paperdoll Heaven.

In 2005, Stardoll was launched as a browser game under the guidance of CEO Mattias Miksche. The game was incredibly successful and served as a starting place for some of Sweden's top tech industry performers, such as Spotify founder Daniel Ek and Lifesum co-founder Marcus Gners and Henrik Torstensson.

In November 2011, Stardoll teamed up with Mattel to release a Stardoll line of Barbie dolls. The "Stardoll by Barbie" collection featured eight fashion dolls, based on four of the most popular virtual Stardoll stores in Starplaza. Inspired by Stardoll avatars, "Stardoll by Barbie" dolls came packaged mirroring the signature Stardoll poses.

In May 2016, Stardoll celebrated its ten-year anniversary. Also in 2016, Mattias Miksche bought out his partner investors and placed Stardoll in the hands of gaming industry veteran, Thomas Lindgren. "He knows everything about the gaming industry and was the first person to help me understand that Stardoll is a gaming company," said Mattias Miksche of Thomas Lindgren. Miksche now  serves the company as acting chairman of the board.

Under new management, Stardoll AB changed its name to Glorious Games Group AB and has expanded its offerings to include Stardoll, mobile app Stardoll Stylista, and fashion retail and social networking app and website Clique.

Concept
Stardoll is a virtual community site for people who enjoys fame, fashion and friends. 

At Stardoll, players can create their own virtual doll or choose from a collection of celebrity dolls and dress them up in various styles of make up, clothing, and decor with a wide range of items available for purchase with in-game currency. 

Stardoll appeals to a wide cross section of users, but their core membership consists of boys and girls from the ages of 13 and upwards. 

Stardoll was developed with an emphasis on self-expression through fantasy and fashion. Glorious Games has committed to maintaining Stardoll as an inspiring, safe and creative environment for all players with interest in fashion, friendship, and community. 

Players use in-game currency to purchase clothing, beauty, and decor items from Starplaza, the game's virtual shopping plaza. The Stardoll membership is free, and most of the game's core features are entirely free of charge. All members can earn Starpoints (experience points) and Starcoins (in-game currency) by doing different activities, competing in weekly competitions, and completing challenges within in the game.

Glorious Games 
Glorious Games Group AB started in 2005; back when the company was known as "Stardoll AB" and focused on one single product: Stardoll.com.

Glorious Games is focused on creating safe and entertaining games for young women, an audience usually overlooked by the gaming industry.

Led by CEO Thomas Lindgren, Glorious Games has expanded its offerings by creating two mobile apps: Stardoll Stylista and Clique, a social marketplace.

Stardoll Stylista 
Launched in 2016, Stardoll Stylista is a mobile app available for both iOS and Android. The game allows users to create and customize an avatar using beauty and fashion options. The avatar then follows a career track to become a world-famous stylist by styling friends' and other players' avatars for various social and career events.  Users also vote on various beauty and fashion looks by submitting their avatar to a daily competition.

The game is free to play but offers in-app purchases.

Clique 
Clique is an app and website offering safe and social fashion resale released by Glorious Games.

Clique connects users with similar fashion interests and allows them to create cliques, member groups for buyers and sellers interested in similar styles or fashions. Users can create and lead a Clique group and receive a percentage of items sold within their group. The system is designed to offer sales incentives and the potential for micro business development to active users.

References

External links

 
 Glorious Games

2004 video games
Massively multiplayer online games
Children's websites
Virtual world communities
Swedish entertainment websites